Candice Azzara (born May 18, 1945) is an American character actress.

She is the aunt of actress Lana Parrilla.

Azzara was born in Brooklyn, the daughter of Josephine (née Bravo) and Samuel Azzara. She was inspired to pursue acting by the film La Strada and theatre legend Eleonora Duse. She studied with Lee Strasberg and Gene Frankel and soon began appearing off-Broadway and in regional theatres. In the summer of 1965, she appeared as Eve in On the First Day, a one-act play written by David Graeme and directed by Charles Merlis at the 41st Street Playhouse in Manhattan.

Billed as Candy Azzara, she made her Broadway debut in Lovers and Other Strangers in 1968. Additional stage credits include Jake's Women, Cactus Flower, Any Wednesday, Barefoot in the Park, and The Moon Is Blue.

Azzara was cast as Gloria in the second pilot of All in the Family, when it was titled "Those Were the Days" and the family name was Justice instead of Bunker. She was a regular on the sitcom Calucci's Department and had recurring roles on Caroline in the City, Who's the Boss?, Soap, and Rhoda. She has guested on numerous series, including Diff'rent Strokes, The Wonder Years, The Practice, Kojak, Barney Miller, Trapper John, M.D., L.A. Law, CHiPs, Soap, One Day At A Time, The Love Boat, Night Court, Remington Steele, Murder, She Wrote, ER, Married... with Children and Joan of Arcadia.

Partial filmography

Film

References

External links
 
 
 
 
 Candice Azzara on TvGuide

American film actresses
American stage actresses
American television actresses
American people of Italian descent
People from Brooklyn
1945 births
Living people
Actresses from New York City
21st-century American women